In medicinal chemistry and pharmacology, a binding coefficient is a quantity representing the extent to which a chemical compound will bind to a macromolecule. The preferential binding coefficient can be derived from the Kirkwood-Buff solution theory of solutions. Preferential binding is defined as a thermodynamic expression that describes the binding of the cosolvent over the solvent. This is in a system that is open to both the solvent and cosolvent.  Consequently, preferential interaction coefficients are measures of interactions that involve “solutes that participate in a reaction in solution.”

See also 
 Binding constant
 Partition coefficient
 Binding affinity

References 

Medicinal chemistry